Sarah, Plain and Tall is a children's book written by Patricia MacLachlan and the winner of the 1986 Newbery Medal, the 1986 Scott O'Dell Award for Historical Fiction, and the 1986 Golden Kite Award. It explores themes of loneliness, abandonment, and coping with change.

The book was followed by four more books exploring the Witting family after Sarah's arrival: Skylark, Caleb's Story, More Perfect Than the Moon, and Grandfather's Dance.

Plot overview 
The story is set in the Midwestern United States during the late 19th century. Jacob Witting, a widowed farmer who is still saddened by the death of his wife during childbirth several years before, finds that the task of taking care of his farm and two children, Anna and Caleb, is too difficult to handle alone. He writes an ad in the newspaper for a mail-order bride. Sarah Wheaton, from Maine, answers his ad and travels out to become his wife.

While Anna is initially apprehensive about Sarah as she still has memories of her late mother, Caleb is excited and deeply hopes that Sarah will stay. When she departs conditionally for one month, Anna notices that Sarah is lonely and misses the sea. Sarah is stubborn and persistent, and she gradually wins over Jacob with her insistence on learning and helping out with farm tasks. The Wittings become attached to Sarah, though Caleb constantly worries that their home is not enough for her and that she misses the sea. When Sarah goes to town by wagon on her own, Anna tries to reassure Caleb that Sarah will return, while secretly fearing that she will not. They are overjoyed when Sarah returns by nightfall. Admitting that she misses the sea, Sarah says that she would miss them more if she left. Anna reveals that Jacob and Sarah married soon afterward.

Adaptations

Film adaptations 
Sarah, Plain and Tall was adapted into a television movie, Sarah, Plain and Tall. The screenplay was written by MacLachlan, and it starred Glenn Close and Christopher Walken.

The next two books in the series—Skylark and Caleb's Story—were the basis for two more television movies—Skylark and Sarah, Plain and Tall: Winter's End. MacLachlan wrote the screenplays, and the same actors played the roles of Sarah, Jacob, Anna, and Caleb.

Stage adaptation 
The story was made into a one-act children's musical and produced by TheatreWorksUSA. The score is by Laurence O'Keefe and Nell Benjamin. The musical ran Off-Broadway at the Lucille Lortel Theatre during summer 2002 with a cast that included Becca Ayers as Sarah and John Lloyd Young as Caleb. It was brought back to New York in 2004, with a sold-out three-week run off-Broadway. It also ran at the O'Neill Theater Center in Waterford, Connecticut in August 2003, with direction by Joe Calarco and featuring Kaitlin Hopkins.

References 

Newbery Medal–winning works
Golden Kite Award-winning works
1985 American novels
American children's novels
Harper & Row books
Children's historical novels
Novels set in the 19th century
American novels adapted into films
1985 children's books
American novels adapted into plays